Mark Miremont is an American artist who works in photography, experimental film, music video and aphoristic writing.

Early life and education 
Mark Miremont was born in Madrid, Spain and studied philosophy at UCLA & Harvard. His first experimental film "Antinomies" led to him being invited into Graduate School at the UCLA School of Theater, Film and Television.

Music Videos & Sundance Fellow 
Miremont directed numerous music videos to put himself through film school. The first video he directed was also Soundgarden's first video, "Flower". The video was put into regular rotation on MTV and is notable for being the first music video to establish the grunge aesthetic. His experimental films and music videos caught the attention of the Sundance Institute. He was invited to become a fellow and develop the script for his first experimental feature film, White Ocean. He directed actors Lothaire Bluteau, J. E. Freeman and Glenn Close at the Institute's June Filmmaker's Lab.

Photography and experimental films

Photography
Miremont shoots stylized portraits and often erotic figure studies of notable people in alternative culture like: Dita Von Teese, Mamie Van Doren, KMFDM, Soundgarden, Switchblade Symphony. The Chop Tops, Alejandro Jodorowsky, Julie Strain, Puma Swede, Jessica Jaymes, Toad The Wet Sprocket, Chris Whitley, The Koffin Kats,  Lazlo Bane, Gren, Masuimi Max, and many others. His photography has been exhibited around the world and featured in the alternative culture and art press: Argentinian Art Magazine, Revolutionart calls his work, "brash", "sensual" and "largely responsible for the resurgence of the pinup". YNOT Europe describes his work as "wildly original and perfectly composed". AVN Magazine calls his work, "distinctive"; and he has been dubbed, "The Pope of Pinup", by Italian Art Magazine STIRATO.

Carnival of Desires
In 2004, Miremont released a collection of eight short films under the title "Carnival of Desires". Each film explores a different theme related to desire and according to AVN, was "shot at an opulent mansion... using a variety techniques". In his review, AVN Editor, Tim Connelly, called it a "glittering and unbelievably hypnotic dreamscape" with "Felliniesque moments of Technicolor fantasy".

The Resurrection of Beauty: Solo Photography Exhibit & Film Premiere
From 2010–2011, Miremont had a solo exhibit of his photography at La Galerie Provacatrice in  Amsterdam, entitled "The Resurrection of Beauty". The exhibit coincided with the premiere of an early cut of his feature length experimental film of the same name. The film stars several notable models, including Dita Von Teese. The screening took place at the world's largest annual alternative fashion event, Wasteland, for an audience of over 6000 people.

Philosophy

The Resurrection of Beauty: Manifesto 
In conjunction with the solo photography exhibit and film premiere, the gallery published Miremont's "The Resurrection of Beauty: a manifesto for 21st century art". Edward Grande of The University of York wrote that Miremont's manifesto is "concerned with refuting the beliefs of artistic rivals"; in this case, Dadism and Conceptual Art. Grande adds that, "though offering engaging discourse on current issues", the manifesto is "ostentatious". The University of North Carolina's Aesthetic Manifesto Analysis lists two central lines from the manifesto as: "Beauty is the purpose of art, just as a building is the purpose of architecture" and "The utility of art is to inform us of beauty, just as the utility of science is to inform us of truth." An aphorism from the manifesto, "It is far more revolutionary to be sincere, romantic and idealistic", was used and credited in a 2011 marketing campaign by the French cognac brand, Courvoisier.

References

External links
markmiremont.com

Miremont MVDB
Miremont on Facebook

Living people
American contemporary artists
Harvard University alumni
University of California, Los Angeles alumni
UCLA Film School alumni
Year of birth missing (living people)